Allan W. Potts (May 14, 1904 – November 5, 1952) was an American National Indoor and Outdoor Champion speed skater who competed in the 1932 Winter Olympics and in the 1936 Winter Olympics. Inducted May 18, 1967, at Detroit, Michigan, into The National Speedskating Hall of Fame  and also once known as The Fastest Human.

He was born in Brooklyn and died in New York City.

In 1932 he participated in the 500 metres event but was eliminated in the heats.

Four years later he finished sixth in the Speed skating at the 1936 Winter Olympics, set a world record in men's 500-metre shortly before the 1936 winter Olympics, and made the time of 42.4 seconds and 32nd in men's 1500-metre.

World records 

Source: SpeedSkatingStats.com

References

 profile

1904 births
1952 deaths
American male speed skaters
Olympic speed skaters of the United States
Speed skaters at the 1932 Winter Olympics
Speed skaters at the 1936 Winter Olympics
World record setters in speed skating